Hanns Zischler (born 18 June 1947) is a German actor known for his portrayal of Hans in Steven Spielberg's film Munich. According to the Internet Movie Database, Zischler has appeared in 171 movies since 1968.

He is known in Sweden for his role as Josef Hillman in the second season of the Martin Beck movies, though his voice is dubbed.

He is sometimes credited as Hans Zischler, Johann Zischler, or Zischler.

Selected filmography

 Summer in the City (1970, directed by Wim Wenders)
 Kings of the Road (1976, directed by Wim Wenders)
 Les Rendez-vous d'Anna (1978, directed by Chantal Akerman)
 Putting Things Straight (1979, directed by Georg Brintrup)
  (1980, directed by Rudolf Thome)
 Angels of Iron (1981, directed by Thomas Brasch)
 Malevil (1981, directed by Christian de Chalonge)
  (1981, directed by Carl Schenkel)
  (1982, directed by Thomas Brasch)
 Doctor Faustus (1982, directed by Franz Seitz)
 A Woman in Flames (1983, directed by Robert van Ackeren)
  (1983, directed by Rudolf Thome)
  (1984, directed by )
 Das Autogramm (1984, directed by Peter Lilienthal)
 The Berlin Affair (1985, directed by Liliana Cavani)
  (1985, directed by ) (TV film)
  (1986, directed by François Chardeaux)
 Tarot (1986, directed by Rudolf Thome)
 Kir Royal (1986, directed by Helmut Dietl) (TV series)
 The Hothouse (1987, directed by )
  (1988, directed by Robert van Ackeren)
 Mon cher sujet (1988, directed by Anne-Marie Miéville)
 Himmelsheim (1989, directed by )
 Der Leibwächter (1989, directed by Adolf Winkelmann) (TV film)
 Francesco (1989, directed by Liliana Cavani)
 La Révolution française (1989, directed by Richard T. Heffron and Robert Enrico) (TV miniseries)
 The Rose Garden (1989, directed by Fons Rademakers)
 Das Haus am Watt (1990, directed by Sigi Rothemund) (TV film)
 Dr. M (1990, directed by Claude Chabrol)
 Europa Europa (1990, directed by Agnieszka Holland)
  (1991, directed by Frank Beyer) (TV film)
 Allemagne 90 neuf zéro (1991, directed by Jean-Luc Godard)
 Salt on Our Skin (1992, directed by Andrew Birkin)
 Abgetrieben (1992, directed by Norbert Kückelmann) (TV film)
 La peur (1992, directed by ) (TV film)
 Tatort:  (1992) (TV series)
 Just a Matter of Duty (1993, directed by Thomas Mitscherlich)
 The Cement Garden (1993, directed by Andrew Birkin)
 Faraway, So Close! (1993, directed by Wim Wenders)
 The Blue One (1994, directed by )
 Charlie & Louise – Das doppelte Lottchen (1994, directed by Joseph Vilsmaier)
  (1994, directed by Jacques Doillon)
 Femme de passions (1995, directed by Bob Swaim) (TV film)
  (1996, directed by Menahem Golan) (TV film)
 Der letzte Kurier (1996, directed by Adolf Winkelmann) (TV film)
 Die Schuld der Liebe (1997, directed by Andreas Gruber)
 23 (1998, directed by Hans-Christian Schmid)
  (2000, directed by Margarethe von Trotta) (TV miniseries)
  (2000, directed by Rudolf Thome)
 Vera Brühne (2001, directed by Hark Bohm) (TV film)
  (2001, directed by Thomas Arslan)
 Beck – Mannen utan ansikte (2001) (TV series)
  (2001, directed by Peter Keglevic) (TV film)
 Taking Sides (2001, directed by István Szabó)
 666 – Traue keinem, mit dem du schläfst! (2002, directed by )
 Amen. (2002, directed by Costa-Gavras)
  (2002, directed by Yves Boisset) (TV film)
 Ripley's Game (2002, directed by Liliana Cavani)
  (2003, directed by Pascal Bonitzer)
  (2003, directed by Rudolf Thome)
 Walk on Water (2004, directed by Eytan Fox)
 Post Impact (2004, directed by Christoph Schrewe) (TV film)
 Olgas Sommer (2004, directed by Nina Grosse)
 Munich (2005, directed by Steven Spielberg) as Hans
 L'Annulaire (2005, directed by Diane Bertrand)
  (2006, directed by Francis Girod)
 March of Millions (2007, directed by Kai Wessel) (TV film)
  (2008, directed by ) (TV film)
 Flame & Citron (2008, directed by Ole Christian Madsen)
 A Year Ago in Winter (2008, directed by Caroline Link)
 Todsünde (2008, directed by ) (TV film)
 Hilde (2009, directed by Kai Wessel)
  (2009, directed by ) (TV film)
 Hinter blinden Fenstern (2010, directed by ) (TV film)
 Content (2010, directed by Chris Petit) (TV film)
 In the Shadows (2010, directed by Thomas Arslan)
  (2011, directed by Hans W. Geißendörfer)
 Playoff (2011, directed by Eran Riklis)
  (2012, directed by Helmut Dietl)
  (2012, directed by ) (TV film)
 Rommel (2012, directed by ) (TV film)
 Stations of the Cross (2014, directed by Dietrich Brüggemann)
 Clouds of Sils Maria (2014, directed by Olivier Assayas)
 All of a Sudden (2016)
 Crash Test Aglaé (2016, directed by Éric Gravel)
 A Prominent Patient (2017)
 Black Island (2021)

References

External links

Above the Line Agency Munich 

1947 births
Living people
German male film actors
German male television actors
20th-century German male actors
21st-century German male actors
Actors from Nuremberg